Sławomir Jan Dębski (born 23 May 1971) is a Polish historian, PhD (Hist.) who has served as director of Polish Institute of International Affairs from 2007 until 2010 and again since 2016. He previously headed The Centre for Polish-Russian Dialogue and Understanding (2011–2016), and was a member of the Polish-Russian Group for Difficult Matters. He was assistant professor of the Cardinal Stefan Wyszyński University in Warsaw (2007–2010) and Warsaw University (2010–2014).

Career
Dębski is a foreign policy expert and an advisor to all Poland's governments since 2000, a team leader, institution builder and interagency communication expert. He joined the Polish Institute of International Affairs (PISM) in 2000 as a Russia foreign policy analyst, then served at PISM as Eastern Europe research coordinator, head of the Research Office (2002–2007), deputy director and ultimately, for the first time, director (2007–2010). In 2008, he was nominated to the Polish-Russian Group for Difficult Matters (2008–2016). In 2010, he became a special appointee of the Minister of Culture and National Heritage for the establishment of the Center for Polish-Russian Dialogue and Understanding (CPRDiP), responsible for drafting an act of the Parliament and legislation procedures. In September 2011 he was appointed a director of CPRDiP. In February 2016, he was appointed a director of PISM for the second time. In this capacity he was a head of NATO Warsaw Summit Experts' Forum 2017 organization team, combining different domestic and international stakeholders.

Since 2019, Dębski has been serving on the Transatlantic Task Force of the German Marshall Fund and the Bundeskanzler-Helmut-Schmidt-Stiftung (BKHS), co-chaired by Karen Donfried and Wolfgang Ischinger.

Writings

Dębski has been the Editor-in-Chief of “Polski Przegląd Dyplomatyczny” [Polish Diplomatic Review] (2007–2010 and 2016–) and the Russian Language Quarterly “Europe” (2001–2010), an author of one of the most acclaimed monographs about the Soviet-German Alliance between 1939 and 1941, with two editions in Poland, and one in Russia (2018). He is also an editor of few volumes of diplomatic documents, dozens of foreign policy studies and essays.

Dębski's book: "Between Berlin and Moscow. German-Soviet relationships 1939–1941" received many good notes and opinions. Zbigniew Brzezinski said that this is: A top-notch reconstruction of a historically complex yet extremely significant phase in the relations between Nazi Germany and Soviet Union. This is an exquisite analysis of the causes of the German-Soviet war and its strategic mechanisms. The examination of alternative soviet war plans indeed sheds new light on the behavior of Stalin, especially in the early stages of the war. Former Polish Minister of Foreign Affair Adam Daniel Rotfeld thinks that Dębski's volume is: Ta fascinating story of friendship and competition, hatred and intrigues between Hitler and Stalin - the two leaders and war criminals at the same time, who governed the greatest totalitarian regimes in history. The clash was inevitable. Sławomir Dębski, an outstanding young generation Polish historian, having analyzed new, previously unknown documents, comes to surprising conclusions. He addresses the questions that have remained open for the last 70 years. What were the motivations that led the leaders of Nazi Germany and Soviet Union to sign the Molotov-Ribbentrop pact on 23 August 1939? Why did Germany invade the Soviet Union on 22 June 1941? In response to these and other questions, the author does not yield to historical clichés or propaganda stereotypes. He has the audacity to formulate independent and autonomous judgments. According to a well-known Polish-American historian Anna M. Cienciała: A monograph by Dębski is the most meticulous study on the German-Soviet relations written so far in any language. [...] The author deserves a great recognition for writing a work that, for years to come, will certainly serve as an undisputed source to historians and researchers of the German-Soviet relations in 1939–1941.

Book
Między Berlinem a Moskwą. Stosunki niemiecko-sowieckie 1939–1941, PISM, Warsaw 2003; corrected second edition 2007 (Between Berlin and Moscow. German-Soviet relationships 1939–1941).

References

External links
Dr Sławomir Dębski in European Leadership Network
Dr Sławomir Dębski in Polish Science Database

1971 births
Academic staff of Cardinal Stefan Wyszyński University in Warsaw
Central European University alumni
Jagiellonian University alumni
Living people
Writers from Kraków
Polish political scientists
21st-century Polish historians
Polish male non-fiction writers
Academic staff of the University of Warsaw